Nogometni klub Žiri, commonly referred to as NK Žiri or simply Žiri, is a Slovenian football club which plays in the town of Žiri. The club was established in 1973.

Honours
Slovenian Fourth Division
Winners: 2001–02, 2017–18

References

External links
Official website 
Weltfussballarchiv profile

Association football clubs established in 1973
Football clubs in Slovenia
1973 establishments in Slovenia